Bormida (A 5359) is an Italian Navy coastal water tanker.

See also
Simeto-class water tanker

References 

Auxiliary ships of the Italian Navy
1974 ships
Ships built in Italy